Laure Saint-Raymond (born 1975) is a French mathematician, and a professor of mathematics at Institut des Hautes Études Scientifiques (IHES). She was previously a professor at École Normale Supérieure de Lyon. She is known for her work in partial differential equations, and in particular for her contributions to the mathematically rigorous study of the connections between interacting particle systems, the Boltzmann equation, and fluid mechanics. In 2008 she was awarded the European Mathematical Society Prize, with her citation reading:

Biography 
Laure Saint-Raymond studied in Paris, entering École Normale Supérieure in 1994. In 1996, she received a Master's degrees in plasma physics from Versailles Saint-Quentin-en-Yvelines University and in applied mathematics from Pierre and Marie Curie University. In 2000 she finished her Ph.D. in applied mathematics at Paris Diderot University, under the supervision of François Golse.

She worked for two years for the French National Centre for Scientific Research, and was named in 2002 full professor of mathematics at the Pierre and Marie Curie University at the age of 27. In 2007, she moved to the École Normale Supérieure, and is now professor at the École Normale Supérieure de Lyon. In 2021, she joined the Institut des Hautes Études Scientifiques in Bures-sur-Yvette, France as permanent professor, the first woman to hold that position in the history of the Institute.

She is the mother of six children.

Awards and honors

Her work has been recognized by many prestigious international awards, notably the Fermat Prize and the Bôcher Memorial Prize. In 2013, she was elected to the French Academy of Sciences, and in 2014 was an invited speaker at the International Congress of Mathematicians. A partial list of her awards and honors include:

2003 : Louis Armand Prize of the French Academy of Sciences
2004 : Claude-Antoine Peccot Award of Collège de France
2004 : Pius XI Medal of the Pontifical Academy of Sciences
2006 : The Best Paper prize of the SIAM Activity Group on Analysis of PDE for:
(with François Golse) "The Navier-Stokes limit of the Boltzmann equation for bounded collision kernels." Invent. Math. 155 (2004), no. 1, 81–161.
2006 : Prize of the City of Paris for Young Scientists (joint with Isabelle Gallagher)
2008 : Prize of the European Mathematical Society
2009 : Ruth Lyttle Satter Prize in Mathematics of the American Mathematical Society for:
(with François Golse) "The Navier-Stokes limit of the Boltzmann equation for bounded collision kernels." Invent. Math. 155 (2004), no. 1, 81–161.
"Convergence of solutions to the Boltzmann equation in the incompressible Euler limit." Arch. Ration. Mech. Anal. 166 (2003), no. 1, 47–80.
2011 : Irène Joliot-Curie Prize of the "Young Scientist Woman"
 2013 : Elected to the French Academy of Sciences (on 10 December 2013)
 2015 : Fermat Prize for:
the development of asymptotic theories of partial differential equations, including the fluid limits of rarefied flows, multiscale analysis in plasma physics equations and ocean modeling, and the derivation of the Boltzmann equation from interacting particle systems.
 2015: Elected to the Academia Europaea
 2020: Bôcher Memorial Prize for:
her transformative contributions to kinetic theory, fluid dynamics, and Hilbert's sixth problem
 2022: elected as an international member to the National Academy of Sciences (NAS).

Research
In 2009, her work was summarized by the Satter Prize committee as:

Major publications

References

External links 
 Laure Saint-Raymond in the ENS website directory
 Recent CV of Laure Saint-Raymond
 
Laure Saint-Raymond in MathSciNet
La mathématicienne Laure Saint-Raymond est nommée professeur permanent à l'Institut des hautes études scientifiques

French women mathematicians
21st-century French mathematicians
1975 births
Living people
Lycée Henri-IV alumni
École Normale Supérieure alumni
21st-century women mathematicians
Members of Academia Europaea
21st-century French women